Flash is a 2005 studio album by Towa Tei. It peaked at number 26 on the Oricon Albums Chart. It includes the track "Sometime Samurai" featuring Kylie Minogue.

Track listing

Charts

References

External links
 

2005 albums
Towa Tei albums
V2 Records albums